George Clifford Richey Jr. (born December 31, 1946) is an American former amateur and professional tennis player who was active during the 1960s and 1970s. Richey achieved a highest singles ranking of World No. 6 and reached at least the quarterfinal stage of the singles event at all four Grand Slam tournaments.

Tennis career
Richey was the American junior national tennis champion in 1962 (16 years) and 1963 (18 years) and in 1964 he won the boys' singles title at the French Championships.

Richey was a member of the American team which won the 1969 Davis Cup against Romania but did not actively participate. He was an active member of the team that won the 1970 Davis Cup, winning both his singles matches in the final against West Germany, and was voted the most valuable player. In September 1971, Richey quit the Davis Cup team before the final against Romania citing his disagreement with the USLTA over the choice of surface and the lack of consultation with players. In total, Richey played in seven Davis Cup ties between 1966 and 1970 and compiled a record of ten wins and three losses.

Richey was the winner of the first Grand Prix tennis circuit, organized in 1970, finishing ahead of Arthur Ashe and Ken Rosewall. His career-high singles ranking was World No. 6, achieved in 1970, and No. 1 in the U.S for that same year. The No. 1 ranking was decided by the outcome of the semifinal match at the Pacific Coast Championships against his direct competitor, Stan Smith, and ultimately came down to just a single point when both players had a match-point at 4–4 in the sudden death tiebreak of the final set.

Richey reached the semifinal of a Grand Slam tournament on three occasions. His first semifinal appearance was at the 1970 French Open where he lost to Yugoslav Željko Franulović in a five-set match after leading two-sets-to-one and 5–1 in the fourth set and having failed to convert two match points. At the 1970 US Open later that year Richey again reached the semifinal which he lost in straight sets to Australian Tony Roche. His last Grand Slam semifinal appearance came two years later at the 1972 US Open where he defeated Rod Laver in the fourth round but was beaten in the semis in straight sets by compatriot Arthur Ashe. His best singles result at the Wimbledon Championships was reaching the quarterfinal in 1971 in which he lost to Ken Rosewall in a close four-hour five-set match.

During the first years of the Open Era, which started in 1968, Richey chose to be an independent professional but in April 1972 he became a contract professional when he signed a four-year contract with Lamar Hunt to join the World Championship Tennis tour.

He is the brother of Nancy Richey, a Hall of Fame tennis player who won two Grand Slam singles tournaments. They were the first brother-sister combination to both be concurrently ranked in the US Top Ten. They were ranked in the Top Three concurrently in 1965, 1967, 1969 and 1970.

Career highlights
 45 tournament titles over the span of a 26-year career (1964–1992) including:
    Canadian Open (1969)
    South African Open (1972)
    U.S. Indoor Championships (1968)
    U.S. Clay Court Championships (1966, 1970)
    South American Championships (1966, 1967)
    Western Open (1965, 1966, 1969)
    Legends Senior Tour Championships (1983)
    CBS Tennis Classic (1974)
 Founding member, Association of Tennis Professionals (1972)

Singles titles

Personal life

Golf highlights:
Founding member, Celebrity Players' Tour (1997) 
Played celebrity golf tour for 15 years (1992–2007)
Won tour events in Jamaica (2004) and Baltimore (2006)
Scratch golfer (74.5 career stroke average; career best round 63)
Mental health awareness fundraising and activism:
Richey organized tennis and golf tournaments to benefit charities:
Angelo Catholic School (1986, 1987, 1988, 1989, 1990)
James Phillips Williams Memorial [Dyslexia] Foundation (1991, 1992, 1993)
Mental Health/Mental Retardation (MHMR) (1999)
United Way (2005, 2006, 2007, 2009)
Nominated for Frank M. Adams Award for Outstanding Volunteer Service (2000)
Public lectures and presentations:
Keynote presentation, Texas state convention for executive directors of MHMR (2000)
Community legislative forums (1999, 2000)
Invited lectures to college campuses and psychology classes (2006, 2007, 2008)
Keynote address, MHMR banquet (Palestine, TX, 2000)
2010 Mental Health America/TX Boots, Bells, and Hearts award
2010 Texas Council of MHMR's Annual Conference, Keynote Speaker, Woodlands TX
2010 NAMI National Convention, breakfast presentation
Fourteen-city book tour for Acing Depression: A Tennis Champion's Toughest Match, 2010
2010 Lecture at the Grand Rounds, New York State Psychiatric Institute, Columbia University to Faculty and trainees
2010 Keynote speaker Montana State Convention on Mental Illness, Billings, Montana

Works

References

External links

 
 
 

1946 births
Living people
American male tennis players
French Championships junior (tennis) champions
People from San Angelo, Texas
Tennis people from Texas
Grand Slam (tennis) champions in boys' singles